BC Lietkabelis, also currently known as BC 7bet-Lietkabelis or 7bet-Lietkabelis for sponsorship reasons, is a Lithuanian professional basketball team based in Panevėžys, Lithuania, participating in the Lithuanian Basketball League and internationally in the EuroCup. It was BC TECHasas till 2012. In October 2011 club owner Darius Gaudiešius donated the basketball club to Algirdas Kriščiūnas, Antanas Kazys Liorentas and Kazimieras Antanynas, related with Ūkio bankas Club got back the legendary name Lietkabelis in 2012 .

History

Early years
The history of basketball club Lietkabelis began in 1964. The club's name did not change for 32 consecutive years. The home-court games were played in Aukštaitija Sports Palace, which was opened in 1965. The construction of the palace was initiated by V. Variakojis. Most of the team's players contributed with their own hands to the palace's construction process. At that time, the team was represented by such sports masters, such as S. Atraškevičius, J. Balakauskas, A. Butkūnas, V. Juchnevičius, E. Kuodys, A. Matačiūnas, R. Petrauskas, R. Sargūnas, V. Stalilionis, J. Zičkus, E. Žurauskas, V. Variakojis and others. Until the establishment of the Lithuanian Basketball League in 1993, Lietkabelis was among the country's strongest basketball teams. During these times, Panevėžys club, trained by R. Sargūnas and V. Paškauskas from 1964 to 1996, became Lithuania's champions twice (1985, 1988), won third place three times (1983, 1984 and 1991) and qualified into the Lithuania's Cup competition finals two times (1985, 1986). Other performances are as follows: 1964, 1965, 1968 and 1989 – 5th places, 1966 and 1969 – 6th places, 1970, 1971, 1980, 1986 and 1993 – 7th places, 1973 and 1977 – 11-12 places, 1975 – 11th place, 1976 – 9-10 places, 1979 – 9th place, 1981 – 8th place and 1982, 1987, 1990, 1992 – 4th places.

1978–1986: playing in USSR Division I
From 1978 to 1986, Lietkabelis represented Lithuania in USSR I division tournament (second-tier competition in the Soviet Union). In more than three decades, many notable basketball persons played for the Panevėžys' team: Algimantas Baziukas, Algirdas Brazys, Raimundas Čivilis, V. Dambrauskas, A. Kairys, M. Karnišovas, Jonas Kazlauskas, Algirdas Kriščiūnas, Rimas Kurtinaitis, Vitoldas Masalskis, O. Moisejenka, Gintaras Leonavičius, Rolandas Penikas, Algimantas Pavilonis, A. Šidlauskas and others. Notable boarding sports school members, who later been a part of the Lithuania national basketball team, trained their skills in Lietkabelis. Such players are: Gintaras Einikis, Dainius Adomaitis, Alvydas Pazdrazdis, Romanas Brazdauskis, Gvidonas Markevičius and others. The team long-time was coached by V. Stankevičius, a Lietkabelis factory director. The factory was team's main sponsor.

1993: Creating the Lithuanian Basketball League

In 1993, basketball club Lietkabelis was one of the eight Lithuanian Basketball League founders. From 1996, after three decades, Lietkabelis factory left basketball world. The team's names were changing constantly: Kalnapilis (1996–1999), Sema (1999–2000), Panevėžys (2000–2001 ir 2004–2007), Preventa-Malsena (2001–2003), Aukštaitija (2003–2004) and Techasas (2007–2012). From January 2012, club's name reverted to the legendary one – Lietkabelis. In 20 LKL seasons the team's jersey was worn by such notable Lithuanian basketball players: Gintaras Bačianskas (19,7 points per game in LKL), Gintaras Kadžiulis, Kęstutis Kemzūra, Mindaugas Lukauskis, Paulius Staškūnas, Žydrūnas Urbonas and others.

In the 1999–2000 season, Panevėžys team (named Sema at that time) participated in international tournament – FIBA Korać Cup for the first time after the country's independence. In 2004–2005 season and from 2007 to 2012, Panevėžys team participated in Baltic Basketball League's second division (renamed to BBL Challenge Cup in 2007). They also played in the BBL Elite Division from 2005 to 2007 and from 2012 to 2014. During ten years in this league, the team achieved first place twice in the BBL Challenge Cup (in 2005 as Panevėžys and in 2012 as Lietkabelis), they also won bronze medals twice as well (in 2008 and 2011 as Techasas). They won the BBL Elite Division, they won the bronze medals in 2016. In the LKL, the highest the team achieved was the quarterfinals, though they did come close in 2007 to reaching the semifinals, losing a very tough series to BC Šiauliai 1:2. In 2016, they also had a tough series against BC Lietuvos rytas, fighting hard in a losing sweep, though only lost the two away games in Vilnius 74:79 and 78:83.

In October 2008, the brand-new Cido Arena was opened in Panevėžys, which has 5656 seats for the basketball spectators. It became new Panevėžys basketball team home-hourt, replacing the Aukštaitija Sports Palace after 43 years.

2015–2020: resurgence and participating in European competitions

On 29 July 2015, the club was invited to join the FIBA Europe Cup tournament, which is the alternative version of the 2nd tier European tournament EuroCup, organized by FIBA. However, just before the drawning ceremony, it was announced that 56 teams would participate instead of 64 and Lietkabelis was not one of these.

On 21 July 2016, Lietkabelis was invited to play in the 2016–17 EuroCup season. The club previously registered again in the FIBA Europe Cup. Following it, the team signed notable veterans: Mindaugas Lukauskis, Kšyštof Lavrinovič and Darjuš Lavrinovič who formed the core of the team. The positive preseason resulted in record sales of over 700 season tickets just on the sales opening day. The LKL season began historically by defeating Žalgiris Kaunas 90–86 for the first time after 16 years. This season became the best one in club history - Lietkabelis had astonishing victories over Žalgiris, BC Lietuvos rytas and BC Neptūnas, the top teams in Lithuania. In the playoffs, Lietkabelis beat BC Vytautas in the quarterfinals 3:0, then shocked Lietuvos rytas 3:1 in the semifinals before losing to Žalgiris in the LKL finals 1:4. Lietkabelis also reached the 2017 King Mindaugas Cup finals, also losing to Žalgiris 63:84. During the season, and the playoffs, Lietkabelis broke many attendance records in Panevėžys.

The debut EuroCup season performance was not less pleasant for the club. On 12 October 2016, Donatas Tarolis buzzer-beater guaranteed Lietkabelis first 89–88 EuroCup victory in the history of the club against KK MZT Skopje. Lietkabelis continued their success in Zagreb, defeating the Croatian champions KK Cedevita 80–76. Another remarkable play was performed by Donatas Tarolis, whose put-back slam secured the victory with just 13 seconds remaining. On 23 November, the record of attendance was achieved, with 4427 spectators during the second game versus Cedevita, though Lietkabelis lost a tough rematch 68:69. Lietkabelis qualified to the Eurocup Top16, with a 3–5 record in the group stage with another win against MZT Skopje, though lost both games to the top teams in the group - CB Gran Canaria and BC Nizhny Novgorod. Lietkabelis played in Group F against former tournament champion BC Khimki, and German giants Bayern Munich and ratiopharm Ulm. While Lietkabelis did not manage to defeat Khimki and Bayern, they won both games against a powerful ratiopharm Ulm team, and finished the Eurocup Top16 phase with a respectable 2–4 record.

On 13 June 2017, it was announced that in the 2017–2018 season Lietkabelis for a second straight time will participate in the EuroCup competition. Consequently, the team successfully extended contracts with the Lavrinovič twins, signed former long-term Lithuania men's national basketball team member Simas Jasaitis and candidate of the national team Adas Juškevičius, who later played during the EuroBasket 2017. The team retained their respectable status by starting the 2017–18 LKL season with a perfect 8–0 record and the 2017–18 EuroCup season by defeating the Israeli League champions Hapoel Jerusalem 86–72. The struggles began for the team after the second game in the Eurocup - a crushing away defeat to Bayern Munich 57:93. After a loss at home to Grissin Bon Reggio Emilia 75:82, Lietkabelis rebounded with a surprising away win against Galatasaray Odeabank 78:73 and a win at home against KK Budućnost 86:79, after a strong performance by Adas Juškevičius, who scored 32 points and hit 9 three-pointers, 7 of which came in the first quarter. After the first round of the Eurocup, Lietkabelis had a 3–2 record. The second round became a disaster – Lietkabelis lost an away game to Hapoel 81:93, followed by a loss to FC Bayern 87:88 at home. Head coach Artūrs Štālbergs was shockingly fired after a few upset losses in the LKL, replaced by assistant Vitaliy Cherniy. Lietkabelis shocked Grissin Bon with an 85:82 away win in Reggio Emilia after the changes, but that did not save the team. Tough losses to Galatasaray 77:84 at home, and 62:76 to KK Budućnost in Podgorica left Lietkabelis with a 4–6 record and a game out of the Top16 round, ending the competition in disappointment.

In the LKL, after an 8–0 start, which included dominating wins against Lietuvos rytas 97:81 at Vilnius and a home win over Neptūnas 88:76, Lietkabelis climbed to 1st place in the standings. The streak was snapped by Žalgiris in Kaunas, 90:92. After a shocking loss to BC Vytautas, the last place team in the LKL, coach Štālbergs was fired. Assistant coach Cherniy briefly took over, before Ramūnas Butautas took over as head coach. Point guards Gary Talton and Adas Juškevičius left the team, and were replaced by the talented Arnas Velička and Dominik Mavra. In the 2018 King Mindaugas Cup, Lietkabelis defeated BC Pieno žvaigždės 86:76 in the quarterfinals, qualifying to the Final Four. Facing Žalgiris in a previous year's finals rematch, Lietkabelis lost 74:88, and defeated BC Dzūkija in a hard-fought game 81:78 to win third place. What followed was a string of losses in the LKL, with Lietkabelis quickly falling out of contention for first place in the standings. Losses to Lietuvos rytas and Neptūnas meant the team finished only fourth in the regular season, a disappointing finish. In the playoffs, Lietkabelis defeated BC Šiauliai 3:1 in the quarterfinals, thanks to veteran leadership and a great series by team leader Žanis Peiners. In the semifinals, Lietkabelis faced Žalgiris - by this point, Lietkabelis was no match against the LKL champions and one of the best teams in the Euroleague, and lost the series in a disappointing 0:3 fashion. In the third place series, Lietkabelis faced BC Neptūnas, coached by Kazys Maksvytis, who a season before coached Lietkabelis to the Eurocup Top16, and the finals of both LKL and KMT. After winning the first game in Klaipėda, 83:69, Lietkabelis lost at home 69:71. Donatas Tarolis had the best game of his career, finishing with a double-double of 26 points and 10 rebounds. Neptūnas went on to win the next two games, 79:71 at home and a second 89:78 win in Panevėžys. Lietkabelis suffered disappointment, losing the series 1:3, and finishing in fourth place.

The finish in the LKL prevented Lietkabelis from playing in the Eurocup. The team then moved to FIBA, to the Basketball Champions League. Initially, Lietkabelis was supposed play in the qualifying round, but after one of the teams, Eskişehir, announced withdrew from the competition, Lietkabelis earned a place in the 2018–19 Basketball Champions League regular season, joining group C along with defending champion AEK Athens, Antwerp Giants, ČEZ Nymburk, Montakit Fuenlabrada, Hapoel Jerusalem, JDA Dijon and last year's Euroleague participant Brose Bamberg. Much of the roster of the previous season left, with the biggest losses being the Lavrinovič twins, Peiners, Lorenzo Williams. Simas Jasaitis remained with Lietkabelis, and was named the team captain. Lietkabelis then signed solid players like point guard Jamar Wilson, center Mike Morrison, guards Fran Pilepić and Paulius Valinskas from Žalgiris, forwards Vytenis Lipkevičius and Saulius Kulvietis and center from Juventus Mindaugas Kupšas. Longtime club player Ernestas Ežerskis also returned to the team. Longtime assistant Gintaras Kadžiulis was named the head coach. Despite having one of the strongest teams in the LKL, by November, Lietkabelis was only in fourth place. In the Champions League, Lietkabelis suffered losses at home to Antwerp Giants 87:91, and away losses to Hapoel Jerusalem 67:81 and Brose Bamberg 77:82, only scoring one win against ČEZ Nymburk at home, 97:86. At this point, Lietkabelis was 1–3. Changes were made, first by bringing in Jonas Vainauskas, the man behind much of BC Rytas success, as sports director. After the loss in Bamberg, Gintaras Kadžiulis was replaced in the coaching position by Nenad Čanak. Vainauskas as sports director only lasted for two months - until his termination on 28 December 2018. During his tenure, Vainauskas made a lot of changes within the team - Lipkevičius, Ežerskis, Morrison and Pilepić all left and were replaced by guards Stefan Sinovec, Marko Čakarević, Davis Lejasmeiers, center Žiga Dimec and new point guard Vaidas Kariniauskas, who played for the team in the 2014 season, Vainauskas also wanted to release Wilson, but he remained with the team. The results were mixed - in the Champions League, the changes helped the team finish the first round strong, with home wins over JDA Dijon 78:62, and Montakit Fuenlabrada 78:67, with only one loss away to champions AEK Athens, 59:65, and with a 3–4 record, were in a playoff position. During Vainauskas tenure, Lietkabelis also defeated Rytas in an away match in Vilnius, 94:83. During December–March, turmoil followed - Kariniauskas was released in controversial fashion, the results continued to decline at an enormous rate. Lietkabelis only won two games out of seven in the second round of the Champions League, finishing with a 5–9 record, fifth place, and out of the playoffs. In the LKL, Lietkabelis struggled so much, that cross-town rival BC Pieno žvaigždės actually tied for fourth place and for a brief time, Lietkabelis fell to fifth. The signing of Ike Iroegbu helped the team. Lietkabelis won third place in the King Mindaugas Cup. Success against BC Neptūnas and BC Rytas, who Lietkabelis beat in the season series, helped Lietkabelis regain fourth place, at 23–13. Valinskas heavily improved during this time, becoming one of the team leaders. Lietkabelis beat Pieno žvaigždės 2:0 in the quarterfinals. In the LKL semifinals, Lietkabelis was no match against Žalgiris Kaunas, losing 0:2. In the third place series, Lietkabelis lost to Neptūnas 0:3.

During the summer, Kupšas, Dimec, Wilson, Tarolis, Valinskas and Iroegbu all left the team. Lietkabelis signed Martynas Sajus, Femi Olujobi and Željko Šakić as the front court. Lietkabelis also signed Tomas Lekūnas, from BC Pieno žvaigždės, and Tomas Dimša from BC Juventus, and Gabrielius Maldūnas from BC Nevėžis, who had great games against Lietkabelis in the previous LKL season. Ken Brown was signed to replace Wilson as the new point guard. Margiris Normantas was signed after a great showing in the pre-season. Marius Valinskas, brother of Paulius, signed to a long-term contract in the summer. Coach Čanak remained with the team. Lietkabelis qualified for the 2019–20 Basketball Champions League by defeating Keravnos in the qualifying round, on aggregate 148-137 (71-55 away, and 77–82 at home). Playing in Group A, along with Türk Telekom, Dinamo Sassari, Baxi Manresa, Hapoel Holon, SIG Strasbourg, Filou Oostende and Polski Cukier Toruń, Lietkabelis started the regular season 0–4. Brown was released due to erratic play, and Paulius Valinskas returned to the team in November. Lietkabelis then made a miraculous comeback in the competition, sparked by amazing play by Šakić and Dimša, and on the final day of the regular season, an away win over Hapoel Holon 69:68, helped Lietkabelis reach the Champions League playoffs for the first time in club history, with a 7–7 record. Olujobi was released and replaced by Gilvydas Biruta, while Rihards Kuksiks replaced Lekūnas, out due to a season ending injury. In the Champions League, Lietkabelis lost to Casademont Zaragoza 0:2, and were eliminated from the tournament. Owing to the Coronavirus pandemic, the LKL season was ended prematurely - in a hugely disappointing development, Lietkabelis suffered what at first seemed an insignificant loss to BC Pieno žvaigždės before the pandemic - the loss, though, allowed Rytas Vilnius to finish the season second, one win over Lietkabelis, who finished in third place. In the King Mindaugas Cup, Lietkabelis also won third place. Much of the roster departed during the summer, in particular Šakić and Dimša, team leaders, being the most painful departures. Coach Čanak remained with the team.

2020-present: EuroCup years
Lietkabelis was invited to join the EuroCup after Rytas left for the FIBA Basketball Champions League during the summer of 2020. Playing in a very strong group, with Virtus Segafredo Bologna, Lokomotiv Kuban, AS Monaco, MoraBanc Andorra and Telenet Giants Antwerp, Lietkabelis finished the season with 2-8 record, one win away from qualification to the Top 16 phase. Kyle Vinales and Margiris Normantas were team leaders during EuroCup season, with players like Gytis Masiulis and late season signing Đorđe Gagić also having some strong games. Lietkabelis managed to reach the finals of the King Mindaugas Cup, where they lost to Žalgiris Kaunas 69:76. In the LKL, Lietkabelis won third place for the second season in a row, by beating BC Juventus 3:2 in the bronze medal series, qualifying once again for the EuroCup for the next season.

During the summer of the 2021, many players departed from the team. Normantas returned to Rytas, while Masiulis, Vinales, Valinskas, and many other important players for the team leaving. Coach Čanak remained with the team. During the summer, Lietkabelis signed Gediminas Orelik, Dovydas Giedraitis, Karolis Giedraitis, Nikola Radičević, Kaspars Bērziņš, Kristupas Žemaitis, also re-signed Lipkevičius, Maldūnas and Gagić to new contracts. Panagiotis Kalaitzakis, one of the best players during the LKL playoffs, also re-signed. While the team was largely considered good for the LKL, in the EuroCup, Lietkabelis, on paper, looked like one of the weakest teams in the competition. Facing the strongest possible competition, Juventut Badalona, Lokomotiv Kuban (disqualified during the season due to Russia's invasion of Ukraine), Partizan NIS, Metropolitans 92, MoraBanc Andorra, Türk Telekom, Hamburg Towers, Śląsk Wrocław and Dolomiti Energia Trento, Lietkabelis shocked everyone - dominant home wins over Juventut, Partizan, Andorra and Metropolitans, great performances even in away games (during the previous season, Lietkabelis had lost all away games), and a 9-7 record helped Lietkabelis reach the EuroCup playoffs. Orelik, Dovydas Giedraitis, Kalaitzakis, Žemaitis had their best seasons of their careers, players like Lipkevičius and Gagić had their resurgence as well. In the EuroCup playoffs, Lietkabelis faced Virtus Segafredo Bologna, fighting to the very end before losing 67:75, to a team that went on to win the EuroCup later during the season. In the LKL, Lietkabelis initially had some struggles, though quickly became one of the top teams at the standings as the season progressed. In the King Mindaugas Cup, Lietkabelis also had a great run. Playing in Vilnius, without Gagić, out due to COVID, and an injury to top point guard Radičević, Lietkabelis faced the hosts Rytas Vilnius in the semifinals, also one of the favorites of the tournament. Down even in double figures, Lietkabelis fought back, and managed to shock Rytas with a 82:80 win to qualify for the finals - for the second year in a row. During the game, much of the crowd actually started cheering for Lietkabelis. In the finals, Lietkabelis faced Žalgiris Kaunas. Having almost no front court, Lietkabelis was destroyed in the paint, and lost the finals 66:91 to Žalgiris. In the LKL, however, Lietkabelis looked to make history - a dominant win against Žalgiris 85:67, in April, assured that Lietkabelis would face Žalgiris again in the LKL semifinals, as Žalgiris would fail to win the LKL regular season. In the LKL playoffs, Lietkabelis beat BC Juventus 3:0 in the quarterfinals. At the start of the semifinals, Lietkabelis lost the first game to Žalgiris 70:71, in controversial fashion, in Kaunas. In Panevėžys, however, Lietkabelis made a comeback - Lietkabelis dominated the game to win 79:55, the biggest loss for Žalgiris ever in the semifinals. In Kaunas, during the third game of the series, Lietkabelis showed why they went so far the EuroCup - down by double digits for most of the game, a huge run in the fourth quarter helped Lietkabelis take a shocking 73:69 away win over Žalgiris, with Lietkabelis taking the lead in the series. In Panevėžys, Lietkabelis did what no other team for almost 30 years in the LKL had done - a 86:75 win over Žalgiris, a 3:1 series win ended the historic 11 year run of Žalgiris as LKL champions, and for the first time in history, Žalgiris had failed to make the LKL finals. Lietkabelis also saw many huge crowds during the series, and qualified to the LKL finals for the second time, after 2017. In the LKL finals, Lietkabelis faced Rytas Vilnius, and in the first game of the series, shocked Rytas with a 77:68 victory in Vilnius. However, that would be it for Lietkabelis, as Rytas won the next four games and won the series 4:1. Despite the loss, Lietkabelis returned to the city as heroes, with thousands of fans showing up to support the team for their amazing efforts during the season. Lietkabelis once again earned a spot in the EuroCup, for the 2022-2023 season.

Players

Current roster

Depth chart

Squad changes for/during the 2022–23 season

In

|}

Out

|}

Honours

Domestic competitions
Lithuanian SSR Championship
 Winners (2): 1985, 1988
Lithuanian Basketball League
Runners-up (2): 2017, 2022
3rd place (2): 2020, 2021
King Mindaugas Cup
Runners-up (3): 2017, 2021, 2022
3rd place (3): 2018, 2019, 2020, 2023

Regional competitions
BBL Challenge Cup
Winners (2): 2005, 2012
3rd place (2): 2010, 2011
BBL Championship
3rd place (1): 2016

Club achievements

Detailed information of former rosters and results.

Notable players

To appear in this section a player must be either:
 A player who has played at least 3 seasons (if foreign player) or 5 seasons (if Lithuanian player) for the club.
 A player who has won an individual award.
 A Lithuanian player who has played for the Lithuanian national basketball team.
 A foreign international player who has significantly contributed into the results of the club.
 A Lithuanian player who has significantly contributed into the results of the club.

 Lithuanians:
 Egidijus Karalevičius 1993–1994
 Žydrūnas Urbonas 1993–1994, 1995–1998, 2007–2008
 Paulius Staškūnas 1993–1998, 2001–2002, 2003–2004, 2005–2009
 Dainius Pleta 1994–1997
 Gintaras Bačianskas 1994–1995, 1996–1997
 Gintaras Leonavičius 1994–1996
 Andrius Vyšniauskas 1996–1998
 Gediminas Ramonas 1996–1999
 Gintaras Kadžiulis 1996–1999
 Gintaras Stulga 1998–1999, 2000–2001
 Mindaugas Lukauskis 1996–2001, 2016–2017
 Saulius Raziulis 1993–1994, 1998–2001
 Nerijus Varnelis 1997–1998, 2006–2007
 Marius Janišius 2002–2004, 2008–2009
 Tomas Gaidamavičius 2004–2007
 Giedrius Jankauskas 2004–2007
 Mindaugas Budzinauskas 2007–2008
 Darius Griškėnas 2007–2010, 2012–2015
 Aidas Viskontas 2009–2010
 Gytis Sirutavičius 2004–2005, 2009–2010, 2012–2013
 Egidijus Dimša 2010–2011, 2014–2015
 Vaidas Čepukaitis 2011–2012
 Edgaras Ulanovas 2012–2013
 Vaidotas Volkus 2012–2013
 Vytenis Čižauskas 2014
 Dainius Šalenga 2014–2015
 Žygimantas Janavičius 2014, 2016–2017
 Evaldas Žabas 2014–2015
 Darjuš Lavrinovič 2016–2018
 Kšyštof Lavrinovič 2016–2018
 Žygimantas Skučas 2016–2018

 Lithuanians (cont):
 Valdas Vasylius 2008–2009, 2010–2011, 2013–2015
 Adas Juškevičius 2017–2018
 Simas Jasaitis 2017–2019
 Vytenis Lipkevičius 2018–
 Gabrielius Maldūnas 2019–
 Kristupas Žemaitis 2021-22

 Foreigners:
 Christopher Hill 2007–2009
 Robert Griffin 2007–2008
 Demarius Bolds 2008–2009
 Goran Vrbanc 2013–2014
 Jurica Žuža 2014–2015
 Brandon Wood 2015
 Lorenzo Williams 2016–2018
 Ben Madgen 2016–2017
 Žanis Peiners 2017–2018
 Jamar Wilson 2018–2019
 Đorđe Gagić 2020–2022
 Panagiotis Kalaitzakis 2021–2022
 Nikola Radičević 2021–2022

References

External links

 Official website of BC Lietkabelis 
 BC Lietkabelis LKL.lt 

BC Lietkabelis
Basketball teams in Lithuania
Sport in Panevėžys
KK Panevėžys
Basketball teams established in 1964